Neoamphion is a genus of beetles in the family Cerambycidae, containing the following species:

 Neoamphion triangulifer (Aurivillius, 1908)
 Neoamphion vittatus (Reiche, 1839)

References

Agapanthiini